Goodwin is a locality in Alberta, Canada.

Goodwin was the name of local cattlemen in the 1920s.

References 

Localities in the Municipal District of Greenview No. 16